Spirulina agilissima  is a freshwater cyanobacteria from the genus Spirulina.

References

 

Spirulinales
Bacteria described in 1900